Collinsia is a genus of about 20 species of annual flowering plants, consisting of the blue eyed Marys and the Chinese houses.  It was traditionally placed in the snapdragon family Scrophulariaceae, but following recent research in molecular genetics, it has now been placed in a much enlarged family Plantaginaceae.

The genus is endemic to North America, and is named in honor of Zacchaeus Collins, a Philadelphia botanist of the late eighteenth/early nineteenth century. Many of the 20 species may be found in California.

Two species, Collinsia parviflora (smallflower blue eyed Mary) and Collinsia violacea (violet blue eyed Mary), had medicinal uses among American Indian peoples.

Species include:

Collinsia antonina
Collinsia bartsiifolia
Collinsia callosa
Collinsia childii
Collinsia concolor
Collinsia corymbosa
Collinsia grandiflora
Collinsia greenei
Collinsia heterophylla
Collinsia linearis
Collinsia multicolor
Collinsia parryi
Collinsia parviflora
Collinsia parvula
Collinsia rattanii
Collinsia sparsiflora
Collinsia tinctoria
Collinsia torreyi
Collinsia verna
Collinsia violacea

References

External links
 Calflora Database: Collinsia species
Jepson Manual Treatment of Collinsia

 
Annual plants
Plantaginaceae genera
Taxa named by Thomas Nuttall